Police & Community Youth Clubs (PCYC) or Police and Community Youth Clubs are a network of Australian non-profit, community organisations, founded in New South Wales. In some states such as NSW, they are constituted as an Incorporated Association.

The Mission of PCYC is to get young people active in life; develop their skills, character and leadership; and prevent and reduce crime by and against young people. The organisation is community-based and involves the provision of low-cost structured activities to children and adults, aimed specifically at the underprivileged persons in the community. The clubs contain a wide variety of sports such as basketball, indoor soccer, weightlifting gyms, dancing, wrestling/grappling, boxing, martial arts and many other activities and hobbies. Different clubs may have different activities going on to one another. The PCYC has a range of over 60 clubs across the State.

History
The first PCYC was opened in Woolloomooloo, New South Wales on 1 April 1937 by the Police Commissioner, William John Mackay. They were originally known as the "Police Rotary Youth Club", and later, "Police Boy's Clubs".

In 1936, Mackay visited England, Germany, Italy and the US with the brief of “reviewing the methods of combating crime”. He praised the Nazi labour youth battalions because, he said, they "subordinate the individual to the welfare of the nation". Upon returning to Australia, he garnered the support of the Rotary Clubs in Australia, who provided financial report and set up the first Police Boys Club, based on his observance of the Hitler Youth.

States
Name & locations of PCYC's in each state.
 Police Citizens Youth Clubs NSW
 Police Citizens Youth Club Queensland
 Western Australia Police & Community Youth Centre
 Tasmanian Association of Police & Community Youth Clubs
 Victoria Police & Citizens Youth Club
 Blue Light Victoria
 Kyabram Blue Light (Central Victoria)
 Bendigo Blue Light
 Alpine Blue Light
 Mernda Blue Light
 Canberra Police & Community Youth Club

References

External links
Branches include:
 New South Wales
 Queensland
 Australian Capital Territory 
 Western Australia
 St. Kilda, Victoria
 Tasmania

1937 establishments in Australia
Youth organizations established in 1937
Youth organisations based in Australia
Non-profit organisations based in New South Wales
Children's charities based in Australia
Educational charities based in Australia